Noblella duellmani is a species of frog in the family Strabomantidae. It is endemic to Peru and only known from its type locality, Cillapata, at  asl in the Paucartambo District, Pasco Region.

Noblella duellmani is only known from the holotype, which was collected from a seldom used or abandoned pasture, surrounded by secondary and primary forest. Later searches at the type locality and neighbouring areas have not resulted in new findings. Threats to this species that is either rare or difficult to find are unknown.

References

duellmani
Amphibians of Peru
Endemic fauna of Peru
Amphibians described in 2004